Wave properties may refer to:

 Physical properties of waves: transmission, reflection, polarization, diffraction, refraction and others
 Mathematical description of waves: amplitude, frequency, wavelength, and others